In mathematics, quasi-bialgebras are a generalization of bialgebras: they were first defined by the Ukrainian mathematician Vladimir Drinfeld in 1990. A quasi-bialgebra differs from a bialgebra by having coassociativity replaced by an invertible element  which controls the non-coassociativity. One of their key properties is that the corresponding category of modules forms a tensor category.

Definition 
A quasi-bialgebra  is an algebra  over a field  equipped with morphisms of algebras

along with invertible elements , and  such that the following identities hold:

This definition is constructed so that the category  is a tensor category under the usual vector space tensor product, and in fact this can be taken as the definition instead of the list of above identities. Since many of the quasi-bialgebras that appear "in nature" have trivial unit constraints, ie.  the definition may sometimes be given with this assumed.

Braided quasi-bialgebras 
A braided quasi-bialgebra (also called a quasi-triangular quasi-bialgebra) is a quasi-bialgebra whose corresponding tensor category  is braided. Equivalently, by analogy with braided bialgebras, we can construct a notion of a universal R-matrix which controls the non-cocommutativity of a quasi-bialgebra. The definition is the same as in the braided bialgebra case except for additional complications in the formulas caused by adding in the associator.

Proposition: A quasi-bialgebra  is braided if it has a universal R-matrix, ie an invertible element  such that the following 3 identities hold:

Again, similar to the braided bialgebra case, this universal R-matrix satisfies (a non-associative version of) the Yang–Baxter equation:

Twisting 
Given a quasi-bialgebra, further quasi-bialgebras can be generated by twisting (from now on we will assume ) .

Then, the set  is also a quasi-bialgebra obtained by twisting  by F, which is called a twist or gauge transformation. However, the twist of a bialgebra is only in general a quasi-bialgebra. Twistings fulfill many expected properties.

Twistings have the important property that they induce categorical equivalences on the tensor category of modules:

Where . Moreover, if  is an isomorphism of braided quasi-bialgebras, then the above induced functor is a braided tensor category equivalence.

Usage 

Quasi-bialgebras form the basis of the study of quasi-Hopf algebras and further to the study of Drinfeld twists and the representations in terms of F-matrices associated with finite-dimensional irreducible representations of quantum affine algebra. F-matrices can be used to factorize the corresponding R-matrix. This leads to applications in statistical mechanics, as quantum affine algebras, and their representations give rise to solutions of the Yang–Baxter equation, a solvability condition for various statistical models, allowing characteristics of the model to be deduced from its corresponding quantum affine algebra. The study of F-matrices has been applied to models such as the XXZ in the framework of the Algebraic Bethe ansatz.

See also 
Bialgebra
Hopf algebra
Quasi-Hopf algebra

References

Further reading 
 Vladimir Drinfeld, Quasi-Hopf algebras, Leningrad Math J. 1 (1989), 1419-1457
 J.M. Maillet and J. Sanchez de Santos, Drinfeld Twists and Algebraic Bethe Ansatz, Amer. Math. Soc. Transl. (2) Vol. 201, 2000

Coalgebras
Non-associative algebras